Carboxypeptidase A1 is an enzyme that in humans is encoded by the CPA1 gene.

Three different forms of human pancreatic procarboxypeptidase A have been isolated. The A1 and A2 forms are monomeric proteins with different biochemical properties. Carboxypeptidase A1 is a monomeric pancreatic exopeptidase. It is involved in zymogen inhibition.

References

Further reading

External links
 The MEROPS online database for peptidases and their inhibitors: M14.001